Novosarayevo (Yañı Haray) is a rural locality (a village) in Znamensky Selsoviet, Belebeyevsky District, Bashkortostan, Russia. The population was 237 as of 2010. There are 7 streets.

Geography 
Novosarayevo is located 43 km east of Belebey (the district's administrative centre) by road. Berezovka is the nearest rural locality.

References 

Rural localities in Belebeyevsky District